James Vila Blake (18421925) was an American Unitarian minister, essayist, playwright and hymn writer and poet.

Blake was born in Brooklyn, New York on January 21, 1842. He graduated from Harvard College in 1862, and from Harvard Divinity School in 1866. He served as pastor in several Unitarian churches in Massachusetts and Illinois. He died in Chicago on April 28, 1925.

Different sources give different, and inconsistent, dates for his pastorates:
 18681871 - Twenty-Eighth Congregational Society, Boston  
 187784 - Quincy, Illinois
 187796 - Quincy, Illinois 
 188397 - Third Unitarian Church, Chicago
 18921916 - Evanston, Illinois

It is certain, however, that he was in Chicago on October 25, 1896. According to a contemporary report, he exhibited cool presence of mind when a serious fire broke out during a service. He was the last to leave the building, which by that time was full of smoke. Seconds later, it burst into flames and was consumed.

He published many essays on religious and other subjects, sermons, poems, and plays.
Notably, he collaborated with Frederick Lucian Hosmer and William Channing Gannett in the compilation and editing of Unity Hymns and Chorals for the Congregation and the Home (1880), an influential hymnbook which was reprinted several times. It includes several of his own hymns. A revised edition was issued in 1911.

While pastor at Evanston, he penned a Covenant which has been adopted by many Unitarian Congregations:Love is the spirit of this church,
and service is its law.
This is our great covenant:
To dwell together in peace,
to seek the truth in love, 
and to help one another.

Several of his poems were set to music by the English composer John Ireland (18791962).

Publications 

Publications by Blake (arranged where possible by date) include:

References

Further reading 
 

1842 births
1925 deaths
Harvard College alumni
Harvard Divinity School alumni
19th-century American dramatists and playwrights
19th-century American poets
American male poets
Writers from Brooklyn
Protestant writers
American male dramatists and playwrights
American Unitarian clergy
19th-century American male writers